Utkela Airport  is owned by the Government of Odisha located at Utkela near Bhawanipatna of Kalahandi district, Odisha, India. The airstrip has been designated to be developed as a regional airport under the Regional Connectivity Scheme (UDAN).

References

Airports in Odisha
Kalahandi district
Airports with year of establishment missing